The No Remorse Tour, sometimes called No Remorse Death on the Road Tour was a concert tour by heavy metal band Motörhead in support of their compilation album, No Remorse. It would be the first tour for the new line up of Phil Campbell, Würzel, and Pete Gill.

Background
Around 1984, Motorhead were beginning to feel that they wished to leave their current record label, Bronze Records. However, over two years ensured of legal issues that kept the band from recording an album. On top of this, Phil Campbell was still contracted with his previous band, Persian Risk's label, Metal Masters. Drummer Pete Gill was also still in litigation with some money that his previous band, Saxon had owed him. As a result of this, only Lemmy and Würzel were able to take credit on the new tracks in No Remorse. As a result, the band decided that for the time being, doing a tour would be good.

Overview 
Lemmy expressed that having a completely new line up of members "took ten years off of me, easy, 'cause they were so excited. The tour saw the band playing shows at Australia and New Zealand for the very first time. On 2 August, at the Shellharbour Club, Motorhead played one of their smallest shows, to a crowd of only 15 people in attendance.

During their 2 December show at Cleveland, the band broke the world record for having the loudest show in the world, at 130 decibels beating The Who's previous record by 10 decibels. It was so loud that it cracked the theatre ceiling, sending plaster down onto the crowd below. Eventually a maintenance worker had to shut Motorhead's concert down, before the damage stopped. A man living near the venue reported that he was able to record the show from his living room.

Around early September, the band took a break to write a couple of songs for what would be their next album Orgasmatron. One of them, "Nothing Up My Sleeve", would be added into the setlist after that. Partway through the UK leg, in early November 1984, Wurzel had to step out for a couple of shows due to having kidney stones, so the band simply kept going as a three-piece. During the show at Hammersmith Odeon, he was taken out on a wheelchair and played a couple of songs.

On 15 December, Wendy O' Williams made a guest appearance and sung No Class with the band.

Setlist
"Iron Fist"
"Stay Clean"
"Heart of Stone"
"The Hammer"
"Metropolis"
"Shoot You in the Back"
"Jailbait"
"Killed by Death"
"Ace of Spades"
"Steal Your Face"
"Nothing Up My Sleeve" (added on 12 October)
"(We Are) The Road Crew"
"Bite the Bullet"
"The Chase Is Better Than the Catch"
"No Class"
"Motorhead"

Encore
 "Bomber"
"Overkill"

Other songs played 
 "Over the Top"
 "Too Late Too Late"
 "America"
 "Locomotive"

Tour dates

Personnel
Lemmy Kilmister – bass guitar, vocals
Phil "Wizzö" Campbell – guitar
Michael "Würzel" Burston – guitar
Pete Gill – drums

References

Bibliography 

Motörhead concert tours
1984 concert tours